The ACT Fire and Rescue (previously known as ACT Fire Brigade) is the urban fire and rescue service for the Australian Capital Territory. It along with the ACT Ambulance Service, ACT State Emergency Service and ACT Rural Fire Service are part of the Australian Capital Territory Emergency Services Agency (formerly the ACT Emergency Services Authority).

By 2011 the ACT Fire and Rescue maintained nine stations with more than 330 staff operating 34 vehicles 2011.

Fire Stations/Apparatus

Fire Apparatus Glossary/(Callsigns) 
 Pumper: (P1/P2/P5/P6/P8/P9)
 Heavy Rescue Pumper: (RP3/RP4/RP7)
 Hazmat Response Vehicle: (HAZ20)
 Breathing Apparatus Support Vehicle: (BA27)
 Rosenbauer B42 Platform: (A30)
 Logistics Vehicle: (B35)
 Platform on Demand Truck: (T40/T41)
 Vertical Rescue Vehicle: (R48)
 Remote Area Road Rescue Vehicle: (R49)
 CAFS Light Tanker: C82/C92
 CAFS Heavy Tanker: C88/C98
 Commander: (CMDR1/CMDR2/CMDR3)
 Confined Space Rescue Trailer (CSRtr)
 Bobcat (T190)
 Light Brush Tanker: (LU51/LU61)
 Heavy Tanker (W13/W53/W63)

Pods:

 Breathing Apparatus Support (BAS)
 Breathing Apparatus Accountability & Command (CMD)
 General Purpose (GP)
 Mass Decontamination Support (MDS)
 Rapid Decontamination Support (RDS)
 Rehabilitation (RHB)
 Salvage & Ventilation (S/V)
 Technical Rescue Support (TRS)
 Tilt Tray (TT)
 Urban Search & Rescue 1 (USAR1)
 Urban Search & Rescue 2 (USAR2) 
 Welfare Support (WFS)

See also
 Australian Capital Territory Rural Fire Service
 Australian Capital Territory Emergency Services Agency

References

External links
 ACT Fire and Rescue Official page

Organisations based in Canberra
Fire and rescue services of Australia
Emergency services in the Australian Capital Territory
1913 establishments in Australia